Plaksin (male) and Plaksina (female) (Russian: Плаксин, Плаксина) are Russian surnames. They derived from the non-calendar given name Plaksa (translates as "crybaby, weeper") that belonged to the apotropaic group of names that were supposed to turn away harm or misfortune from a child. First mentions of Plaksa and Plaksin surnames date back to the first half of the 16th century and include both peasants and boyars of Veliky Novgorod, Nizhny Novgorod and Arzamas.

Notable people
 Gleb Plaksin (1925—2008), French-born Soviet and Russian film actor
 Ivan Plaksin (1803—1877), Russian lieutenant-general, grandson of Trofim Plaksin
 Suzie Plakson (born Susan Plaksin 1958), American actress, singer, writer, poet, and artist
 Valentina Plaksina (born 1996), Russian rower
 Vasily Plaksin (1795—1869), Russian writer, literary historian and educator
 Yaroslav Plaksin (1963), Russian - American Creator of Liquor and Wine Brands. <ref> [http://www.muranowine.com/ | http://www.ilcarnevalediveneziawine.com/about_wine.html | nephew of the Gleb Plaksin

References

Surnames of Russian origin